Arco Mirelli is an underground metro station currently under construction that will serve Line 6 on the Naples Metro. The Arco Mirelli station, designed by the architect Hans Kollhoff, will serve the areas of Via Caracciolo, the Villa Comunale (within which there is the Anton Dohrn Zoological Station), and the eastern part of the district Mergellina. The railway complex will be built at the west end of the Villa Comunale near the monument to the Four Days of Naples in Piazza della Repubblica, and will consist of two glass pavilions, with obvious reference to the original architecture of the gardens. The previous station is San Pasquale, the next is Mergellina.

References

See also 
 Railway stations in Italy
 List of Naples metro stations

Proposed Naples Metro stations
Railway stations in Italy opened in the 21st century